Vezin is a surname. Notable people with the surname include:

Frederick Vezin (1859–1933), American painter, etcher and lithographer
Hermann Vezin (1829–1910), American actor and writer
Jane Vezin (1827–1902), British actress

See also
Vezin-le-Coquet, a French commune
Charency-Vezin, a French commune
Vezins (disambiguation)